Wand (Wall) is an oil painting by Gerhard Richter executed in 1994. It was in Richter's private collection for over 15 years before he sold it to the Wako Works of Art gallery in Tokyo in 2010. It was sold at Sotheby's, London, on 12 February 2014 for £17,442,500.

Bibliography 
 Exhibition Catalogue, London, Anthony d'Offay Gallery, Gerhard Richter, 1998, p. 87, no. 806, illustrated in colour 
 art Das Kunstmagazin, no. 12, December 1999, front cover, illustrated in colour
 Robert Storr, Gerhard Richter: Malerei, Ostfildern 2002, p. 245, illustrated in colour
 Joost Zwagerman, Transito, Amsterdam/Antwerp 2006, pp. 160–61, illustrated in colour

References

1994 paintings
Paintings by Gerhard Richter